Three Rivers is a stream in the U.S. state of Oregon, located in Yamhill County.

See also
 List of rivers of Oregon

References

Rivers of Yamhill County, Oregon
Rivers of Oregon